Rover Dangerfield is a 1991 American animated musical comedy film starring the voice talent of comedian Rodney Dangerfield, who also wrote and co-produced the film. It is about a street dog named Rover, who is owned by a Las Vegas showgirl. Rover gets dumped off Hoover Dam by the showgirl's boyfriend. However, rather than drowning, Rover ends up on a farm.

Plot
Rover is a Basset Hound that lives a life of luxury in Las Vegas with his owner Connie, a showgirl. He gambles and flirts with girls with his best friend Eddie. One night, he sees Connie's criminal boyfriend Rocky in a transaction with a pair of gangsters and accidentally disrupts it by dropping a bone into the meeting. Thinking that Rocky is an undercover cop setting them up, the gangsters flee as the big boss tells Rocky that he has blown his last chance as Rocky quotes that it's just a stupid dog outside. He throws the bone towards a fleeing Rover and Eddie.

The next day, Connie goes on tour for two weeks, leaving Rocky to look after Rover. In retaliation for ruining his deal, Rocky stuffs Rover in a bag, drives him to Hoover Dam and throws him into the water.

The bag is later pulled out of the water by two passing fishermen, who take Rover back to shore and place him in the back of their pickup truck. Rover regains consciousness and jumps out of the truck when the fishermen stop for gas, and begins to wander down the road. He ends up in the countryside, and eventually runs into a farmer, Cal, and his son, Danny, who convinces his father to take the dog in. Cal agrees on one condition: at the first sign of trouble, he'll be sent to an animal shelter. If nobody claims him, the animal shelter can put him down.

Rover has difficulty adjusting to life on the farm but with a help of Daisy, a beautiful collie next door, and the other dogs on the farm, he succeeds in earning their trust. Rover spends Christmas with the family, and begins to fall in love with Daisy, who returns his affections.

However, one night, a pack of wolves attempt to kill a turkey on the farm. As Rover attempts to save the turkey, the wolves run off, but the bird ends up dead and Cal mistakenly believes Rover to have been responsible. The next morning, Cal takes Rover into the woods to shoot him, but he hesitates and is attacked by the wolves. Rover manages to chase off the wolves, and rallies the other farm dogs to get the injured Cal home.

Rover's heroics make the papers, allowing Eddie and Connie to find out where he is. Danny informs Rover of his trip back to Las Vegas and he departs the farm. Although initially happy to be reunited with Connie and his friends, Rover soon begins to miss his life on the farm. When Rocky comes into Connie's dressing room, and upon seeing him, Rover initiates revenge. After Rocky accidentally confesses to what he did, Connie angrily punches him in the face and breaks up with him. Infuriated, Rocky tries to retaliate against Connie, but Rover and his dog friends chase him out of the casino, where a gangster beckons him into their limo. At first, Rocky is happy they saved him, but then questions their presence in the first place. The big boss quotes "This is a setup. Wanna see Hoover Dam"? The limo drive off with a horrified Rocky as Rover says his goodbyes to him.

Sometime later, Rover, missing Daisy, becomes depressed. Realizing he has met someone, Connie takes Rover back to the farm to stay and allows Cal and Danny to keep him this time. Rover is reunited with Daisy, who leads him to the barn and reveals to him that he is now a father, unveiling six puppies: Five of them resembles Rover and one resembles Daisy. The story ends with Rover teaching his kids how to play cards and playfully chasing Daisy around the farmyard.

Voice cast
 Rodney Dangerfield as Rover, Rover's Son
 Susan Boyd as Daisy
 Ronnie Schell as Eddie
 Ned Luke as Raffles
 Shawn Southwick as Connie
 Sal Landi as Rocky
 Bert Kramer as Max
 Robert Pine as Duke
 Dana Hill as Danny
 Eddie Barth as Champ
 Dennis Blair as Lem
 Don Stewart as Clem
 Gregg Berger as Cal
 Heidi Banks as Katie
 Paxton Whitehead as Count
 Ron Taylor as Mugsy, Bruno
 Chris Collins as Big Boss, Sparky, Horse
 Chris Collins and Tom Williams as Coyotes
 Chris Collins, Bernard Erhard, and Danny Mann as Wolves
 Robert Bergen as Gangster, Animal
 Tress MacNeille as Queenie, Chorus Girls, Hen, Chickens, Turkey
 Dee Bradley Baker as Rover and Daisy's Pups

Additional voices by Bob Bergen, Louise Chamis, Bill Farmer, Barbara Goodson, Patricia Parris, Burton Sharp, and Ross Taylor

Production
Conceived in the late 1980s, the film was planned at the time for a December 1988 release. It was originally planned as an R-rated animated film, in the vein of Ralph Bakshi's films, but Warner Bros. wanted the film's content to be toned down to a G-rating. Cartoonist Jeff Smith, best known as the creator of the self-published comic book series Bone, described working on key frames for the film's animation to editor Gary Groth in The Comics Journal in 1994. He also described the film as "terrible".

Reception and legacy

On the review aggregator website Rotten Tomatoes, the film has an approval rating of 40% based on reviews from 5 critics, with an average rating of 3.80/10.

Entertainment Weekly graded the film a 'C', questioning Dangerfield's decision to make the film and said, 'Dangerfield should have known he had written a no-win scenario. His strongest suit — that gleeful lounge-act vulgarity — has always been a little too crass for kids. Yet when Rover offers gooey, sentimental life lessons, it feels unconvincing, like a rock star in a suit. This mongrel-movie badly wants to be a kidvid hit, and with that star and decent animation chops, it stands a chance. But don't bet the farm on it.' TV Guide awarded the film two stars, criticizing the tone and inconsistent animation, and said, 'The result is a confused hybrid creation, suspended in a twilight zone between Don Bluth's benign but dull children's fare and Ralph Bakshi's gratingly hip work.'

Screen Rant listed Rover Dangerfield as one of his must-see performances stating that:

"To hear Dangerfield voice an animated version of himself is quite funny, and the film, while no classic, is completely watchable due to Dangerfield's fresh and entertaining voice-performance".

Home video
The film was released on VHS and LaserDisc on February 12, 1992. Warner Archive later released the film on DVD on January 24, 2011.

See also
 List of American films of 1991
 List of animated feature films

References

External links

 
 
 

1991 films
1991 animated films
1990s adventure films
1991 fantasy films
1990s musical comedy films
1991 romantic comedy films
1990s American animated films
American adventure comedy films
American children's animated adventure films
American children's animated comedy films
American children's animated fantasy films
American children's animated musical films
American musical comedy films
American romantic comedy films
American romantic musical films
Animation based on real people
Animated romance films
Animated films about dogs
Films set in the Las Vegas Valley
Films with screenplays by Harold Ramis
Films with screenplays by Rodney Dangerfield
Warner Bros. animated films
Warner Bros. films
Films scored by David Newman
Hyperion Pictures films
1990s children's animated films
1990s children's comedy films
The Kushner-Locke Company films
1990s English-language films